Robert William Lyall-Grant (10 September 1875 – 1955) was Chief Justice of Jamaica from August 1932. He had previously been Attorney General of Kenya and a puisne judge of Ceylon.

Lyall-Grant was born the son of John Lyall-Grant in Aberdeen, Scotland and educated at Aberdeen Grammar School and at Aberdeen and Edinburgh Universities, where he studied law as a Vans Dunlop scholar. He was called to the bar in 1903.

After working in practice until 1909 he moved to Africa to take up the post of Attorney General of Nyasaland before serving as a High Court judge there. In July 1920 he was appointed Attorney General of Kenya before being promoted in 1926 to be a Puisne Judge in Ceylon. His final appointment in August 1932 was that of Chief Justice of Jamaica.

He retired in 1936.

References 

1875 births
1955 deaths
People from Aberdeen
People educated at Aberdeen Grammar School
Alumni of the University of Aberdeen
Alumni of the University of Edinburgh
Puisne Justices of the Supreme Court of Ceylon
Chief justices of Jamaica
20th-century Jamaican judges
British people in British Jamaica
British people in British Kenya
British people in British Ceylon